Leny Yoro (born 13 November 2005) is a French professional footballer who plays as a centre-back for Ligue 1 club Lille.

Early life
Leny Yoro was born on 13 November 2005 in Saint-Maurice, France. At the age of five, he started playing football at Alfortville where he stayed one season before moving with his family in the Lille area. He then pursued his football learning in Villeneuve-d'Ascq, where he grew up, and finally joined Lille's youth system in 2017.

Club career
Yoro debuted with Lille reserve team in 2022, and quickly signed his first professional contract with the club on 10 January 2022. He made his professional debut with Lille in a 3–1 Ligue 1 win over Nice on 14 May 2022. At 16 years six months and one day of age, Yoro is the second youngest Lille player, behind Joël Depraeter-Henry and taking the second place from Eden Hazard.

International career
Born in France, Yoro is of Ivorian descent through his father. He is a youth international for France, having represented the France U17s.

References

External links
 
 FFF Profile

2005 births
Living people
People from Saint-Maurice, Val-de-Marne
French sportspeople of Ivorian descent
French footballers
Footballers from Val-de-Marne
Association football defenders
France youth international footballers
Ligue 1 players
Championnat National 3 players
Lille OSC players